This is a list of flags in the United States describing the evolution of the flag of the United States, as well as other flags used within the United States, such as the flags of governmental agencies. There are also separate flags for embassies and ships.

National flags

Historical progression of designs
Since 1818, a star for each new state has been added to the flag on the Fourth of July the year immediately following each state's admission. In years in which multiple states have been admitted, the corresponding number of stars were added to the flag. This change has typically been the only change made with each revision of the flag since 1777, with the exception of changes in 1795 and 1818, which increased the number of stripes to 15 and then returned it to 13, respectively. As the exact pattern of stars was not specified prior to 1912, many of the historical U.S. national flags (shown below) have had varied arrangements of the stars.

Other historical versions

Executive branch flags

Office of the President

Office of the Vice President

Department of State

Department of the Treasury

Department of Defense

Department of the Army

Army

Department of the Navy

Navy

Marine Corps

Department of the Air Force

Air Force

Space Force

National Guard Bureau

Civil Air Patrol
The Civil Air Patrol (CAP) is a congressionally chartered, federally supported non-profit corporation that serves as the official civilian auxiliary of the U.S. Air Force. It has quasi-military organizational and rank structures modeled on those of the Air Force.

Department of Justice

Department of the Interior

Department of Agriculture

Department of Commerce

National Oceanic and Atmospheric Administration

National Oceanic and Atmospheric Administration Commissioned Officer Corps

Department of Labor

Department of Health and Human Services

United States Public Health Service Commissioned Corps

Department of Housing and Urban Development

Department of Transportation

Department of Energy

Department of Education

Department of Veterans Affairs

Department of Homeland Security

Coast Guard

Legislative branch flags

Congress

Other federal flags
Many agencies, departments, and offices of the U.S. federal government have their own flags, guidons, or standards. Following traditional American vexillology, these usually consist of the agency's departmental seal on a blank opaque background, but not always.

State and territory flags

The flags of the U.S. states, territories, and federal district exhibit a variety of regional influences and local histories, as well as different styles and design principles. Nonetheless, the majority of the states' flags share the same design pattern consisting of the state seal superimposed on a monochrome background, commonly every different shade of blue, which remains a source of criticism from vexillologists.

The most recent current state flag is that of Mississippi (November 3, 2020, officially January 11, 2021), while the most recent current territorial flag is that of the Northern Mariana Islands (July 1, 1985).

History
Modern U.S. state flags date from the 1890s, when states wanted to have distinctive symbols at the 1893 World's Columbian Exposition in Chicago, Illinois. Most U.S. state flags were designed and adopted between 1893 and World War I.

According to a 2001 survey by the North American Vexillological Association, New Mexico has the best-designed flag of any U.S. state, U.S. territory, or Canadian province, while Georgia's state flag was rated the worst design. (Georgia adopted a new flag in 2003; Nebraska's state flag, whose design was rated second worst, remains in use to date.)

Current state flags
Dates in parentheses denote when the current flag was adopted by the state's legislature.

Current federal district flag

Current inhabited territory flags

Current uninhabited territory flags
The U.S. national flag is the official flag for all islands, atolls, and reefs composing the United States Minor Outlying Islands. However, unofficial flags have been used for three of these nine insular areas:

County flags

City flags

Maritime flags

Ensigns

National
Since 1777, the national ensign of the United States has also simultaneously served as its national flag. The current version is shown below; for previous versions, please see the section Historical progression of designs above.

States

Other

Jacks

Distinctive marks

Commissioning pennants

Native American tribal flags

Associated state flags
While the countries mentioned are recognized independent nations with United Nations seats, the United States maintains and exercises jurisdictional control over the countries in defense, security, and funding grants.

Historical flags

American Revolutionary War

Former federal flags

Other states

Former territories and administered areas

See also

 Flag Day in the United States
 Flag desecration in the United States
 Flags of the U.S. states and territories
 North American Vexillological Association
 United States Flag Code

References

External links

 The History of U.S. Flags (YouTube) (Slideshow on U.S. National Flags Historical Progression)
 History of the flags 
 

 
United States
History of the United States by topic
United States history-related lists